XL Airways was a British low-cost charter and scheduled airline, which ceased operations when it went into administration on 12 September 2008. Its headquarters were in Crawley, West Sussex, near London Gatwick Airport. It was part of the XL Leisure Group. From its three bases at London Gatwick, Manchester and Glasgow, the airline provided short-haul and long-haul charter services, predominantly to leisure destinations. 

The airline also operated services from Newcastle, Bristol, East Midlands, Birmingham and Ireland West. Two other airlines (both now also defunct as of 2019) within the group used the XL Airways branding: XL Airways France and XL Airways Germany, and were not at the time affected by the insolvency of the XL Leisure Group.

History
 

The airline was established in 1994 as Sabre Airways, and started operations on 17 December 1994. The name Excel was adopted following the acquisition, in November 2000, of a 67% stake by Libra Holidays Group, and subsequently increased. In March 2004, the Avion Group (now Eimskipafélag Íslands) completed the purchase of 40.5% of the Excel Airways Group.  As a new charter airline, Excel, concentrated on flights from Gatwick and Manchester to holiday destinations including Greece, Cyprus, Turkey, Spain, the Canaries, St Lucia and Egypt.

In March 2006, Excel Airways signed an agreement with GE Commercial Aviation Services for the lease of two Next-Generation Boeing 737-900ER (Extended Range) aircraft. They were the first examples of the latest variant of the Boeing 737 aircraft to operate in the UK when delivered in May 2008.

Following the merger of sister company Air Atlanta Europe in May 2006, the airline acquired three Boeing 747-300 aircraft. They were operated between the UK and Orlando for Travel City Direct, but left the fleet in November 2007, following the expiration of their leases.

On 30 October 2006, members of the management purchased XL Leisure Group from Avion Group. XL Leisure Group consisted of Excel Airways Group in the UK, Star Airlines France and Star Europe in Germany.

As part of a major brand relaunch in November 2006, the XL.com website and aircraft branding was adopted by the Excel Airways Group. Sister airlines in Germany and France were also re-branded.

Cessation of operations
On 11 September 2008, parent company XL Leisure Group filed for administration, although for some time the group's website continued taking bookings. The group later announced, via its website, that on 12 September 2008, 11 companies associated with the group had been put into administration, including XL Airways UK Limited. That did not affect the German and French divisions of the company's operations.

The company issued the following statement: "The companies entered into administration having suffered as a result of volatile fuel prices, the economic downturn, and were unable to obtain further funding. The joint administrators cannot continue trading the business and therefore all flights operated by the companies have been immediately cancelled and the aircraft grounded;"

The airline's demise left around 90,000 stranded passengers in 50 destinations across Europe, USA, the Caribbean and Africa.
63,000 of the stranded passengers were on package holidays, so were covered by the ATOL bond, which ensures paid-for repatriation. The Civil Aviation Authority (CAA) chartered a number of aircraft from a variety of British airlines. 
One widely reported Astraeus flight from Sharm el-Sheikh was flown by Iron Maiden lead singer Bruce Dickinson. Passengers who had booked direct, and were therefore not ATOL-protected, had to arrange their own flights home, but in some cases were offered special fares by airlines, or were offered spare seats on CAA-organised flights at a reasonable cost.

Destinations 

On 26 August 2008, XL Airways announced the cancellation of the Caribbean long-haul programme until further notice from 3:00 November 2008, due to high fuel prices and declining passenger numbers. Routes cancelled were: St Kitts & Nevis, Trinidad & Tobago, St Lucia, Antigua, Grenada, Barbados. The airline's destinations prior to ceasing operations were:

Alicante
Antalya
Antigua
Arrecife
Barbados Focus city
Belfast
Birmingham
Bodrum
Bristol Base
Burgas
Calgary
Chambéry
Chania
Corfu
Dalaman
East Midlands Base
Faro
Fuerteventura
Funchal
Geneva
Glasgow Base
Grenoble
Heraklion
Humberside
Hurghada
Ivalo
Kalamata
Kaieteur
Kavala
Kefallinia
Kos
Larnaca
Las Palmas
La Romana
London Gatwick Base
London Luton (Scheduled flights)
Luxor
Mahón
Málaga
Malta
Manchester Base
Marsa Alam
Monastir
Murcia
Mykonos
Mytilene-Lesbos
Newcastle Base
Ovda
Orlando-Sanford
Palma de Mallorca
Paphos
Porto Santo
Preveza
Rhodes
Santorini
Sharm el-Sheikh
Skiathos
Taba
Tel Aviv
Tenerife
Thessaloniki
Tobago
Vancouver
Venice
Volos
Zakynthos

XL Airways Ireland 
From May 2007 XL Airways operated flights from Dublin, Cork and Knock which were marketed through XL Holidays as XL Airways Ireland. The inaugural flight operated from Dublin to Palma on 1 May 2007. Flights were offered to the following destinations prior to the airline ceasing operation:

From Dublin:
Bourgas
Faro
Mykonos
Palma de Mallorca
Reus
Santorini
Skiathos
Zakynthos

From Cork:
Santorini

From Knock:
Bourgas
London Gatwick
Faro

Incidents and accidents 
On 16 July 2003, an Excel Airways Boeing 737-800 (G-XLAG) with 190 passengers and seven crew took off from Manchester Airport while vehicles were working near the end of the runway. Despite the crew being told the runway was operating at reduced length, they took off from a runway intersection with reduced length using a reduced thrust setting calculated for the assumed normal runway length. Six safety recommendations were made.

On 4 November 2004, the left wing of an Excel Airways Boeing 767-200 (G-SATR) struck the right horizontal stabiliser of a stationary Bmibaby Boeing 737-300 while both aircraft were awaiting departure from Manchester Airport. The investigation concluded that the Excel 767 Captain, who bore primary responsibility for collision avoidance, misjudged the available separation due to a combination of physiological limitations, distractions and a false assumption regarding his Air Traffic Control clearance.

Awards 
The airline won a number of awards, including Best Charter Airline 2006, World's Leading Charter Airline 2004, 2005 and 2007, Best Charter Airline 2004 and 2005 and UK Charter Airline Punctuality Awards for Summer 2002 - Runner Up.

Fleet 

The XL Airways UK fleet included the following aircraft:

Sponsorship 
For the 2007-2008 football season, XL Airways were the sponsors of West Ham United F.C. West Ham only received £2.5 million out of the planned £7.5 million sponsorship deal, which they cancelled on 12 September 2008 when the XL Leisure Group went into administration.

See also
 List of defunct airlines of the United Kingdom

References

External links

Sabre Airways Fleet
Sabre Airways Stewardess uniforms

Airlines established in 1994
Airlines disestablished in 2008
Defunct airlines of the United Kingdom
Companies that have entered administration in the United Kingdom
1994 establishments in England
2008 disestablishments in England